Agrostis stolonifera (creeping bentgrass, creeping bent, fiorin, spreading bent or carpet bentgrass) is a perennial grass species in the family Poaceae.

Description
Agrostis stolonifera is stoloniferous and may form mats or tufts.

This differs from common bent, Agrostis capillaris, which is short and does not come to a point.

The leaves are tapering, often with a blue-grey colour. The grass is not tufted and the spikelets are red and tightly closed within the panicle. It flowers in July and August.

Distribution
It can be found growing in a variety of habitats including woodlands, grasslands and meadows, wetlands, riparian zones, and as a pioneer species on disturbed sites. It is native to Eurasia and North Africa (Algeria, Morocco and Tunisia). It is possible that it may also be native to northern parts of North America, and in any case it has been widely introduced and naturalised on that continent and in many other places.

It is a constituent of wet habitats such as marshy grasslands. Some of its species have adapted to contaminated conditions and can cope with heavy metals.

Cultivation
It is the most commonly used species of Agrostis.

It is used for turf in gardens and landscapes, particularly on golf courses. Many of the putting greens as well as an increasing number of fairways in the northern USA are creeping bentgrass.

Transgenic Varieties

In the 1990s, Scotts Miracle-Gro and Monsanto led early work in creeping bentgrass transgenics looked at glyphosate-resistance. However, due to easy wind pollination, seeds were accidentally dispersed from an experimental farm in Oregon in 2003. Scotts Miracle-Gro was fined $500,000 as a result. In 2017, the USDA agreed not to regulate it at Scotts request, which meant that Scotts "will no longer be legally required to pay to clean up the grass after 2017, though it has promised to do so."

Other work in transgenic bentgrass looks into salinity tolerance. The improved performance of the transgenic plants was associated with higher relative water content, higher sodium uptake and lower solute leakage in leaf tissues, with higher concentrations of Na+, K+, Cl- and total phosphorus in root tissues, and with higher auxin accumulation rate in the root tissue. This transgenic plant can survive in the presence of 1.7% sodium chloride (half seawater salinity concentration), while the non transgenic line and wild type plants cannot.

References

stolonifera
Flora of Asia
Flora of Europe
Flora of North Africa
Flora of Western Asia
Lawn grasses
Plants described in 1753
Taxa named by Carl Linnaeus